Legacy of the Incas is a 1965  adventure film directed by Georg Marischka and starring Guy Madison, Rik Battaglia, and Heinz Erhardt. It was made as a co-production between Bulgaria, Italy, Spain, and West Germany. It is based on the 1892 novel of the same name by Karl May, and was part of a boom in adaptations of the writer's work.

Location shooting took place in Peru, Spain and Bulgaria. The film's sets were designed by the art director Saverio D'Eugenio.

Synopsis
In nineteenth century Peru, two envoys are sent by the government to negotiate with descendants of the Incas and other tribes to stave off a rebellion. Meanwhile, a bandit who killed an Inca priest several years prior seeks to exploit the unrest to his own advantage.

Cast
Guy Madison as Jaguar / Karl Hansen
Rik Battaglia as Antonio Perillo
Fernando Rey as President Castillo
William Rothlein as Haukaropora
Francisco Rabal as Gambusino
Heinz Erhardt as Professor Morgenstern
Chris Howland as Don Parmesan
Walter Giller as Fritz Kiesewetter
Geula Nuni as Graziella
Carlo Tamberlani as Anciano
Raf Baldassarre as Geronimo
Santiago Rivero as Minister Ruiz
Ingeborg Schöner as Mrs. Ruiz
Lyubomir Dimitrov as El Brazo Valiente
Bogomil Simeonov as Grosso

References

Bibliography

External links
 

1965 films
1960s historical adventure films
West German films
Films based on works by Karl May
Films set in the 1870s
Films set in Peru
Films shot in Peru
Films shot in Bulgaria
1960s German-language films
Films scored by Angelo Francesco Lavagnino
Films directed by Georg Marischka
German historical adventure films
Italian historical adventure films
Spanish historical adventure films
Bulgarian historical films
1960s German films
1960s Italian films